New York is an unincorporated community in Santa Rosa County, Florida, United States.

References

Unincorporated communities in Santa Rosa County, Florida
Unincorporated communities in Florida